The 1949 USC Trojans football team represented the University of Southern California (USC) in the 1949 college football season. In their eighth year under head coach Jeff Cravath, the Trojans compiled a 5–3–1 record (4–2 against conference opponents), finished in a tie for third place in the Pacific Coast Conference, and outscored their opponents by a combined total of 214 to 170.

Schedule

Coaching staff
 Head coach: Jeff Cravath
 Assistant coaches: Roy "Bullet" Baker (backfield coach), Ray George (line coach), Sam Barry (head scout), Bill Fisk (end coach), Walt Hargesheimer (backfield coach), Harry Smith (freshman coach)

Roster
HB #16 Frank Gifford, So.

References

USC
USC Trojans football seasons
USC Trojans football